Malacocera is a genus of flowering plants belonging to the family Amaranthaceae.

Its native range is Australia.

Species
Species:

Malacocera albolanata 
Malacocera biflora 
Malacocera gracilis 
Malacocera tricornis

References

Amaranthaceae
Amaranthaceae genera